"Yo x ti, tú x mí" is a song by Spanish singer-songwriter Rosalía and Puerto Rican singer Ozuna. Written by both performers alongside El Guincho and produced by the later one with the help of Frank Dukes, the track was released as a single on August 15, 2019 through Columbia Records. Continuing the journey and exploration of Rosalía to urban music that "Con altura" started, it reached number one in the singer's home country, becoming her fifth number-one single and her fourth consecutive number-one. It later won two Latin Grammy Awards for Best Urban Song and Best Urban Fusion/Performance, becoming the second time Rosalía wins in those categories consecutively and Ozuna's first ever win in the Grammy field.

Background 
The song was first teased by Rosalía on her social media on 13 August 2019. The snippet sees the singer wearing a headband and facetiming Ozuna. Rosalía previously expressed appreciation for Ozuna's music by posting an acoustic version of "Amor Genuino" in July 2019. The song is also featured on the official soundtrack of FIFA 20, which was released via Spotify, Apple, and Deezer on September 13.

Critical reception 
In a positive review, Suzy Exposito of Rolling Stone complimented the song for being a "featherweight reggaeton groove" while also pointing out the "flirty verses" between the singers. Suzette Fernandez at Billboard noted that the song fuses "reggaeton, flamenco and electronic sounds". Writing for MTV, Madeline Roth stated that the song is "a romantic, reggaeton offering with a deceptively simple chorus".

Music video 
A music video for "Yo x ti, tú x mí" was released through Rosalía's YouTube channel on 15 August 2019. It was directed by Cliqua (RJ Sanchez and Pasqual Gutierrez). It was recorded in a mansion in Miami in January 2019 which means the song had been recorded previously. The filming lasted four days. The video features shots of Rosalía and Ozuna getting close with each other and dancing in various luxury hotel rooms while going through multiple costume changes. Jem Aswad of Variety described the visuals as "a light-hearted romantic outing with the Puerto Rican rapper/singer" and drew comparisons to Ariana Grande.

Personnel 
Credits adapted from Tidal.
 Rosalía Vila – songwriting, production, vocals
 Pablo Díaz-Reixa – songwriting, production, recording engineering
 Juan Carlos Ozuna – songwriting
 Frank Dukes – production
 Jacob Richards – assistant engineering
 Mike Seaberg – assistant engineering
 Rashawn Mclean – assistant engineering
 Jaycen Joshua – mixing
 Chris Athens – master engineering
 Hi Flow – recording engineering
 Morning Estrada – recording engineering

Charts

Weekly charts

Year-end charts

Certifications

Release history

See also 
 List of Billboard Hot Latin Songs and Latin Airplay number ones of 2019

References 

2019 singles
2019 songs
Rosalía songs
Ozuna (singer) songs
Number-one singles in Spain
Spanish-language songs
Song recordings produced by el Guincho
Songs written by Rosalía
Songs written by el Guincho
Songs written by Ozuna (singer)